The Satellite Award for Best Sound is one of the annual Satellite Awards given by the International Press Academy.

Winners and nominees

1990s

2000s

2010s

2020s

References

External links
 Official website

Sound